The hormone of gonadotropins secreted by the anterior hypophyse gland effects on the gonads and play a crucial role in the process of gonadal development and function in vertebrates. In birds and mammals, luteinizinghormone (LH) regulates sex steroid production as well as ovulation, whereas follicle stimulating hormone (FSH) promotes spermatogenesis and ovarian follicle maturation. Since the isolation of gonadotropin-releasing hormone (GnRH), a hypothalamic decapeptide, from mammalian brain in the early 1970s, several other GnRHs have been identified in the brains of other vertebrates. Based on extensive studies in vertebrates,  it  was  generally  believed  that  GnRH  is  the  only hypothalamic regulator of the release of pituitary gonadotropins. Some neurochemicals and peripheral hormones [e.g.gamma-aminobutyric acid (GABA), opiates, gonadal sex steroids, inhibin] can modulate gonadotropin release, but GnRH was considered to have no hypothalamic antagonist.

See also
 Neuropeptide VF precursor
 Gonadotropin-inhibitory hormone

References

External links 
 10th International Symposium on GnRH

Hormones of the hypothalamus-pituitary-gonad axis
Peptide hormones
Animal reproductive system
Sex hormones
Precursor proteins